Polskie Radio Spółka Akcyjna (PR S.A.; English: Polish Radio) is Poland's national public-service radio broadcasting organization, owned by the State Treasury of Poland.

History 
Polskie Radio was founded on 18 August 1925 and began making regular broadcasts from Warsaw on 18 April 1926.

Czesław Miłosz, recipient of the 1980 Nobel Prize in Literature, worked as a literary programmer at Polish Radio Wilno in 1936.

Before the Second World War, Polish Radio operated one national channel – broadcast from 1931 from one of Europe's most powerful longwave transmitters, situated at Raszyn just outside Warsaw and destroyed in 1939 due to invasion of German Army – and nine regional stations: 
Kraków from 15 February 1927
Poznań from 24 April 1927
Katowice from 4 December 1927
Wilno from 15 January 1928
Lwów from 15 January 1930
Łódź from 2 February 1930
Toruń from 15 January 1935
Warszawa from 1 March 1937 – known as Warszawa II, the national channel becoming Warszawa I from this date
Baranowicze from 1 July 1938
A tenth regional station was planned for Łuck, but the outbreak of war meant that it never opened.

The invasion of Poland by Nazi Germany and the Soviet Union led to the destruction of the network in September 1939, with its final broadcast being a performance of Nocturne in C-sharp minor, Op. posth. by Władysław Szpilman. Years later, Szpilman played the same piece for the reopening of the station. 

After the war, Polskie Radio was reconstructed with the assistance of the Soviet Red Army, which valued radio as a propaganda medium. It came under the tutelage of the state public broadcasting body Komitet do Spraw Radiofonii "Polskie Radio" (later "Polskie Radio i Telewizja" – PRT, Polish Radio and Television). This body was dissolved in  1992, Polskie Radio S.A. and Telewizja Polska S.A. becoming politically dependent corporations, each of which was admitted to full active membership of the European Broadcasting Union on 1 January 1993 with the merger of EBU and OIRT.

Channels

National
 Program 1 (Jedynka – One) – information and adult contemporary music (AM-LW (225 kHz)/1333 meters, FM, DAB+ and Internet radio)
 Program 2 (Dwójka – Two) – classical music and cultural (FM, DAB+ and the internet)
 Program 3 (Trójka – Three) – rock, alternative, jazz, and eclectic (FM, DAB+ and the internet)
 Program 4 (Czwórka – Four) – youth oriented (DAB+ and the internet)
 Polskie Radio 24 (PR24) – news and spoken-magazines (FM, DAB+ and the internet)
  – Polish classical music (DAB+ and the internet)
  – children programming during daytime, parents magazines in the evening and Jazz music at night (DAB+ and the internet)
  – music and information for drivers' (DAB+ and the internet)
  – pop music (internet only)

Program 4 and Polskie Radio 24 also carried as a live video feed in the internet.

Regional stations
Polskie Radio also operates 17 regional radio stations (operating on FM, also on DAB+), located in:

 Białystok (Radio Białystok)
 Bydgoszcz (Radio Pomorza i Kujaw)
 Gdańsk  (Radio Gdańsk)
 Katowice (Radio Katowice)
 Kielce (Radio Kielce)
 Koszalin (Radio Koszalin)
 Kraków (Radio Kraków)
 Lublin (Radio Lublin)
 Łódź (Radio Łódź)
 Olsztyn (Radio Olsztyn)
 Opole (Radio Opole)
 Poznań (Radio Poznań)
 Rzeszów (Polskie Radio Rzeszów)
 Szczecin (Radio Szczecin) 
 Warszawa (Polskie Radio RDC)
 Wrocław (Radio Wrocław)
 Zielona Góra (Radio Zachód)

City stations
Polskie Radio offers city stations in:

 Gorzów Wielkopolski – Radio Gorzów
 Lublin – Radio Freee
 Poznań – MC Radio
 Słupsk – Radio Słupsk
 Szczecin – Radio Szczecin Extra
 Wrocław – Radio RAM
 Zielona Góra – Radio Zielona Góra
 Łódź – Radio Łódź Nad Wartą

All city stations but Radio Szczecin Extra are being broadcast on FM and in Internet, while Radio Szczecin Extra is available only in Internet and via DAB+.

Digital-only
Polskie Radio also offers regional digital-only stations (all operating in Internet and DAB+ only) in:
 Kielce – Folk Radio (folk music)
 Kraków – OFF Radio Kraków (cultural)
 Wrocław – Radio Wrocław Kultura (cultural)
 Opole – Radio Opole 2
 Olsztyn – Radio Warmii i Mazur
 Łódź – Radio Łódź Extra
 Kraków – Radio Kraków Kultura

International
 Radio Poland (known until January 2007 as Radio Polonia) – external broadcasts in Belarusian, English, German, Polish, Russian, and Ukrainian – short wave, medium wave, satellite, DAB+ and the internet

Music charts
Polskie Radio Trójka has been compiling Polish music charts since 1982 – in an era before there were any commercial sales or airplay rankings – making them a significant record of musical popularity in Poland. Chart archives dating from 1982 are available to the public via the station's website.

See also 
 Polish Radio External Service
 Informacyjna Agencja Radiowa
 Polish Radio and Television
 Radio stations in interwar Poland
 Narodowa Orkiestra Symfoniczna Polskiego Radia z siedzibą w Katowicach

Other radio stations in Poland:
 RMF FM
 Radio Eska
 Radio Zet

References

External links 

 Polskie Radio Online
 Polskie Radio SA – corporation site
 theNews.pl – Polish Radio broadcasts in English
 Polish Radio News Portal
 Polish Radio News Music and Music Band News

 
1925 establishments in Poland
Eastern Bloc mass media
Radio stations established in 1925
Publicly funded broadcasters
Polish news websites